Deuterocopus atrapex is a moth of the family Pterophoridae described by Thomas Bainbrigge Fletcher in 1909. It has been recorded from Sri Lanka, Assam, Selangor, the Tenasserim Hills, south-eastern Borneo, Ternate, Ambon Island, Batian, southern Sulawesi, the Sangihe Islands, Halmahera, Neu Pommern, northern New Guinea, the Kei Islands, the D'Entrecasteaux Islands and Queensland.

Original description

External links
Australian Faunal Directory
Trin Wiki

Moths of Australia
Deuterocopinae
Moths of Asia
Moths described in 1909